In aviation, holding (or flying a hold) is a maneuver designed to delay an aircraft already in flight while keeping it within a specified airspace.

Implementation
A holding pattern for instrument flight rules (IFR) aircraft is usually a racetrack pattern based on a holding fix. This fix can be a radio beacon such as a non-directional beacon (NDB) or VHF omnidirectional range (VOR). The fix is the start of the first turn of the racetrack pattern. Aircraft will fly towards the fix, and once there will enter a predefined racetrack pattern. A standard holding pattern uses right-hand turns and takes approximately 4 minutes to complete (one minute for each 180-degree turn, and two one-minute straight ahead sections). Deviations from this pattern can happen if long delays are expected; longer legs (usually two or three minutes) may be used, or aircraft with distance measuring equipment (DME) may be assigned patterns with legs defined in nautical miles rather than minutes.

Usage

The primary use of a holding pattern is to delay aircraft that have arrived at their destination but cannot land yet because of traffic congestion, poor weather, or runway unavailability (for instance, during snow removal or emergencies). This is generally described as a stack or holding stack. As a rule, new arrivals will be added at the top. The aircraft at the bottom of the stack will be taken out and allowed to make an approach first, after which all aircraft in the stack move down one level, and so on. Air traffic control (ATC) will control the whole process, in some cases using a dedicated controller (called a stack controller) for each individual pattern.

One airport may have several holding patterns; depending on where aircraft arrive from or which runway is in use, or because of vertical airspace limitations.

Since an aircraft with an emergency has priority over all other air traffic, it will always be allowed to bypass the holding pattern and go directly to the airport (if possible). This causes more delays for other aircraft already in the stack.

Entry procedures

The entry to a holding pattern is often the hardest part for a novice pilot to grasp, and determining and executing the proper entry while simultaneously controlling the aircraft, navigating and communicating with ATC requires practice. There are three standard types of entries: direct, parallel, and offset (teardrop). The proper entry procedure is determined by the angle difference between the direction the aircraft flies to arrive at the beacon and the direction of the inbound leg of the holding pattern.

 A direct entry is performed just as its name would suggest: the aircraft flies directly to the holding fix, and immediately begins the first turn outbound.
 In a parallel entry, the aircraft flies to the holding fix, parallels the inbound course for one minute outbound, and then turns back, re-intercepting the inbound track, and continues in the hold from there.
 In an offset or teardrop entry, the aircraft flies to the holding fix, turns into the protected area, flies for one minute, and then turns back inbound, proceeding to the fix and continuing from there.

The parallel and teardrop entry are mirrored in case of a left-hand holding pattern.

Speed limits

Maximum holding speeds are established to keep aircraft within the protected holding area during their one-minute (one-minute and a half above  MSL) inbound and outbound legs. For civil aircraft (not military) in the United States and Canada, these airspeeds are:
 Up to  MSL: 200 KIAS
 From  MSL: 230 KIAS
  MSL and above: 265 KIAS

The ICAO Maximum holding speeds:

 Up to : 
 : 
 : 
 Above : M0.83
With their higher performance characteristics, military aircraft have higher holding speed limits.

See also

 Heathrow arrival stacks
 Flight planning
 Loiter

References

Aeronautical Information Manual (AIM) paragraph 5-3-8 https://www.faa.gov/air_traffic/publications/atpubs/aim_html/
(7) "A Treatise on the Holding Pattern: Expelling the Myths and Misconceptions of Timing and Wind Correction:, L. Glatt, PhD.
ATP, CFI-AI,  (2016), https://www.holdingpattern.com/holding-patterns.html
(8) "Holding Patterns 101: Finding the Holy Grail of Timing and Wind Correction", L. Glatt, PhD., ATP, CFI-AI (2018), https://www.holdingpattern.com/holding-patterns.html

External links

 E6BX Holding Entry Calculator and Trainer
 Langley Flying School – IFR Rules and Procedures – En Route and Holds
Flight Crew Guide - Entry into the Holding
Flight Crew Guide - Flying the Holding pattern – Wind correction
 SKYbrary - Holding Pattern

Flight phases
Air traffic control